William Charles Frederick MacCarthy-Morrogh (19 November 1870 in Kerry, Ireland – 15 September 1939 in Falmouth, Cornwall, England) was an Irish cricketer. A left-handed batsman and left-arm orthodox spin bowler, he played one first-class cricket match for Dublin University against the MCC in May 1895.

References

1870 births
1939 deaths
Irish cricketers
Dublin University cricketers
People from County Kerry